On a Clear Day is an album by American jazz organist Shirley Scott recorded in 1966 for the Impulse! label.

Reception
The Allmusic review by Scott Yanow awarded the album 4 stars stating "The music grooves and Scott shows that she did not need a competing horn in order to come up with soulful and swinging ideas".

Track listing
 "On a Clear Day (You Can See Forever)" (Burton Lane, Alan Jay Lerner) - 4:48
 "What'll I Do?" (Irving Berlin) - 4:34
 "Cold Winter Blues" (Shirley Scott) - 3:48
 "All Alone" (Berlin) - 4:45
 "What the World Needs Now Is Love" (Burt Bacharach, Hal David) - 3:58
 "Corcovado" (Antonio Carlos Jobim) - 5:23
 "Days of Wine and Roses" (Henry Mancini, Johnny Mercer) - 5:20
 "Instant Blues" (Scott) - 6:15
Recorded in New York City on January 6, 1966

Personnel
Shirley Scott — organ
Ron Carter - bass
Jimmy Cobb - drums

References

Impulse! Records albums
Shirley Scott albums
1966 albums
Albums produced by Bob Thiele